Live 1991 may refer to:

Billy Connolly Live 1991
Live 1991 by The Wedding Present